The Shops & Restaurants at Hudson Yards is an upscale indoor shopping mall in New York City, located at 20 Hudson Yards, at 33rd Street and Tenth Avenue, within the Hudson Yards complex in Midtown Manhattan. It has  of space, including  in retail, including department stores, containing one of the Manhattan’s newest neighborhood with very diverse shops.

In September 2014, Neiman Marcus signed to become the anchor tenant of the Hudson Yards Retail Space. The retail space, designed by Kohn Pedersen Fox and Elkus Manfredi Architects with a connection to the bases of 10 and 30 Hudson Yards, started construction in June 2015, with a  order of steel, one of the largest such orders in the history of the United States. The mall opened on March 15, 2019.

Chef and restaurateur Thomas Keller has opened a restaurant in the complex, in addition to selecting 11 other restaurants in the retail space. There is fine dining on the fifth through seventh floors as well as more casual fare on the second through fourth floors. The mall is anchored by Dior and Chanel, with "a 'Fifth Avenue' mix of shops", such as H&M, Zara, and Sephora below them. The Neiman Marcus closed in 2020 as part of a plan to close 24 locations nationwide, having been open only for 16 months. The former Neiman Marcus is slated to be converted to office space.

Gallery

References

External links
 
 

2019 establishments in New York City
2010s in Manhattan
Commercial buildings in Manhattan
Hudson Yards, Manhattan
Shopping malls in New York City
Shopping malls established in 2019